Jaunciems is a populated place in Tārgale parish, Ventspils municipality,  northwest Latvia. It is one of the twelve Livonian villages. Both the Latvian and Livonian names mean "new village".

See also 
Livonian people

References 
List of Latvia's 278 Nature Reserves

Towns and villages in Latvia
Ventspils Municipality